Youssef Mariana (born 13 May 1974) is a former Moroccan footballer who usually played as midfielder.

References

External links 

1974 births
Living people
Moroccan footballers
Sportspeople from Marrakesh
2000 African Cup of Nations players
Kawkab Marrakech players
Al-Shabab FC (Riyadh) players
Willem II (football club) players
Wydad AC players
Botola players
Saudi Professional League players
Eredivisie players
Moroccan expatriate footballers
Expatriate footballers in the Netherlands
Association football midfielders
Morocco international footballers
Expatriate footballers in Saudi Arabia
Moroccan expatriate sportspeople in Saudi Arabia